Constantin Bogdan (born 29 December 1993) is a Moldovan former professional footballer who played as a defender.

Club career
On 4 January 2016, Bogdan left FC Yenisey Krasnoyarsk by mutual consent.

In July 2021, he retired at the age of 27.

International career
Bogdan was called up to the senior Moldova squad for a UEFA Euro 2016 qualifier against Montenegro in September 2015. He made his senior international debut on 26 February 2018 in a friendly against Saudi Arabia.

Honours
Zimbru Chișinău
Moldovan Cup (1): 2013–14
Moldovan Super Cup (1): 2014

References

External links

1993 births
Living people
Moldovan footballers
Moldovan expatriate footballers
Moldova youth international footballers
Moldova under-21 international footballers
Moldova international footballers
Association football defenders
FC Zimbru Chișinău players
FC Yenisey Krasnoyarsk players
FC Iskra-Stal players
FC Sheriff Tiraspol players
FK Spartaks Jūrmala players
FC Milsami Orhei players
CS Petrocub Hîncești players
Russian First League players
Moldovan Super Liga players
Latvian Higher League players
Moldovan expatriate sportspeople in Russia
Moldovan expatriate sportspeople in Latvia
Expatriate footballers in Russia
Expatriate footballers in Latvia